Jordi Torres Fernández (born August 27, 1987) is a Spanish motorcycle racer.

He is a two-time winner of the Spanish Moto2 championship, and has previously competed in his native Supersport and Stock Extreme championships. He is best known for winning the 2013 German Grand Prix, in the Moto2 class; having qualified in a career-best second place, Torres overtook long-time race leader Pol Espargaró with ten laps remaining, and held on to win the race, his first Grand Prix podium. From 2015 to 2019 he competed in the Superbike World Championship.

Career statistics

Supersport World Championship

Races by year
(key) (Races in bold indicate pole position; races in italics indicate fastest lap)

Grand Prix motorcycle racing

By season

By class

Races by year
(key) (Races in bold indicate pole position, races in italics indicate fastest lap)

Superbike World Championship

Races by year
(key) (Races in bold indicate pole position; races in italics indicate fastest lap)

References

External links
 

1987 births
Living people
Spanish motorcycle racers
Motorcycle racers from Catalonia
Moto2 World Championship riders
FIM Superstock 1000 Cup riders
Superbike World Championship riders
Supersport World Championship riders
Avintia Racing MotoGP riders
MotoGP World Championship riders
MotoE World Cup riders